Tati Quebra-Barraco, (birth name: Tatiana dos Santos Lourenço, born 1980 in Rio de Janeiro), is a Brazilian rapper, whose music consists mostly of hip hop and funk carioca genre. Tati is considered Brazil's first lady of hip hop as the first woman to break the barrier of male-only funkers. She is a popularizer of Baile funk in Brazil and, having been born in Rio de Janeiro's City of God favela, exemplifies that style of hip hop. Her stage name literally translates into "Tati Shack-Wrecker".

Lyrical style 

Barraco demonstrates the prejudices surrounding Baile funk and working-class culture in Brazil in her lyrics: that many or all of the people who come rom the favelas are sexually depraved drug-dealing maniacs. Even with strong sexual meanings, her lyrics nevertheless break down stereotypes, demands equality between men and women, all the while exciting her audience.

Her style of Baile Funk, said to originate from the shantytowns (or favelas) of Brazil, is clearly reflected in her musical stylings and even her lyrics and name, which translates as "Tati shack-wrecker". Her most famous song to date is "Boladona" (2004), whose YouTube video has more than 5 million views.

Success 

In the few years since she has been in the game, she has become one of the genre's top earners selling millions of CDs. Barraco has been known to epitomize the working-class, Baile-funk culture of sex-crazed, "drug-dealing maniacs" and many prominent rumors have been started about her, such as her being arrested for drug possession. Ultimately, Tati's success has not been so much about her music, but from her image on the Brazilian soap America, the related media exposure, and her brazen personality.

Soaps in Brazil can command up to 90% of the viewing public on peak nights, which is no mean feat in a country of 183 million people.  The exposure to the Brazilian public that Tati has enjoyed due to her role in America is staggering.
 Perhaps Tati's painfully honest lyric, which has become her famous catchphrase, "sou feia, mas tô na moda" (I'm ugly, but I'm trendy.) is all too true.  This was also the title for a documentary about Brazilian night life.  The movie maps the Rio de Janeiro funk scene from the point of view of women, who are responsible for creating the "funky" atmosphere for dancehall events.

Personal life 

Barraco is a mother of three children and still lives in the favela.

References

External links 
 official website in Portuguese

1980 births
Living people
Musicians from Rio de Janeiro (city)
Funk carioca musicians
21st-century Brazilian women singers
21st-century Brazilian singers
Brazilian women rappers
Feminist musicians